John Youie "Long John" Woodruff (July 5, 1915 – October 30, 2007) was an American middle-distance runner, winner of the 800 meter event at the 1936 Summer Olympics.

Early life
Woodruff was only a freshman at the University of Pittsburgh in 1936 when he placed second at the National Amateur Athletic Union meet and first at the Olympic Trials (in the heat 1:49.9; WR 1:49.8), earning a spot on the U.S. Olympic team. Woodruff was a member of Alpha Phi Alpha fraternity.

Despite his inexperience, he was the favorite in the Olympic 800 meter run, and he did not disappoint. In one of the most exciting races in Olympic history, Woodruff became boxed in by other runners and was forced to stop running. He then came from behind to win in 1:52.9. The New York Times described the race:

During a career that was curtailed by World War II, Woodruff won one Amateur Athletic Union title in 800 meter in 1937 and won both  and  IC4A titles from 1937 to 1939. Woodruff also held a share of the world 4×880 yard relay record while competing with the national team.

Woodruff graduated from the University of Pittsburgh in 1939, with a major in sociology. While at the University of Pittsburgh, Woodruff became a member of Alpha Phi Alpha fraternity. and then earned a master's degree in the same field from New York University in 1941. He entered military service in 1941 as a second lieutenant and was discharged as a captain in 1945. He re-entered military service during the Korean War era, and left in 1957 as a lieutenant colonel. He was a battalion commander in the 369th Coastal Artillery Regiment, later the 569th Transportation Battalion of the New York Army National Guard.

Later years
In later years Woodruff lived in New Rochelle in Westchester County, New York and in Hightstown, New Jersey. He coached young athletes and officiated at local and Madison Garden track meets. Woodruff also worked as a teacher in New York City, a special investigator for the New York Department of Welfare, a recreation center director for the New York City Police Athletic League, a parole officer for the state of New York, a salesperson for Schieffelin and Co. and an assistant to the Center Director for Edison Job Corps Center in New Jersey. In the late 1990s John, with his wife Rose, retired to Fountain Hills, Arizona residing at Fountain View Village retirement community. Woodruff's last public appearance was on April 15, 2007 when he, along with the members of the Tuskegee Airmen, was honored by the Arizona Diamondbacks by throwing out the first pitch. John Woodruff is buried at Crown Hill Cemetery, Indianapolis (section 46, lot 86).

Legacy
Each year, a 5-kilometer road race is held in Connellsville to honor Woodruff. In 2016, the 1936 Olympic journey of the eighteen Black American athletes, including Woodruff, was documented in the film Olympic Pride, American Prejudice.

References

External links

John Woodruff, Connellsville's Olympic Champion by Jim Kriek
The John Woodruff Story by Julie Bertsch
Pittsburgh Post-Gazette article on Woodruff's 70th anniversary of race
Article on Woodruff, 70 years after his Olympic race

John Woodruff's oral history video excerpts at The National Visionary Leadership Project

1915 births
2007 deaths
American male middle-distance runners
African-American male track and field athletes
Athletes (track and field) at the 1936 Summer Olympics
Sportspeople from the Pittsburgh metropolitan area
Track and field athletes from Pennsylvania
New York University alumni
People from Hightstown, New Jersey
Sportspeople from New Rochelle, New York
People from Connellsville, Pennsylvania
University of Pittsburgh alumni
Pittsburgh Panthers men's track and field athletes
Burials at Crown Hill Cemetery
Medalists at the 1936 Summer Olympics
Olympic gold medalists for the United States in track and field
United States Army personnel of World War II
National Guard (United States) officers
New York National Guard personnel
20th-century African-American sportspeople
21st-century African-American people
African-American history of Westchester County, New York
Military personnel from Pennsylvania
Military personnel from New Jersey